Glyphidocerinae is a subfamily of moths in the family Autostichidae.

Taxonomy and systematics
 Glyphidocera Walsingham, [1892]

References

Glyphidocerinae at funet

 
Autostichidae
Moth subfamilies